This is a list of past and present rolling stock owned and operated by Via Rail in Canada. Via Rail owns 78 locomotives and 619 passenger cars. The tables below list that equipment by type and include some information regarding previously owned and operated equipment. When Via began operation in 1976–1978 it was with a collection of equipment inherited from Canadian National (CN) and Canadian Pacific (CP). Much of this equipment remains in use today. Over the years Via has supplemented this initial fleet with new orders and with new acquisitions of secondhand equipment from other operators.

Locomotives

Current 

Via operates diesel locomotives exclusively. Its fleet of GMD F40PH-2s was recently modernized. The newer GE P42DCs are found only on Corridor services.

Future 

In December 2018, VIA Rail ordered 32 trainsets - each powered by a Charger locomotive - from Siemens for use on the Québec City–Windsor Corridor. The first set arrived in October 2021 and will begin service by the end of 2022.

Former 

Via inherited a diverse fleet of diesel locomotives from Canadian National and Canadian Pacific. It also received three of the experimental UAC TurboTrain gas-turbine trainsets. Between 1980–1984 Bombardier delivered 31 LRC ("Light, Rapid, Comfortable") diesel locomotives with matching cars. The last of these was retired in 2002.

Passenger cars

Stainless steel
The core of Via's long-range fleet is a collection of streamlined equipment originally built by the Budd Company for Canadian Pacific in the 1950s. These were rebuilt by AMF to use head end power and thus are often referred to as the "HEP" fleet.

LRC 

LRC was a series of lightweight diesel-powered passenger trains built by Bombardier that were used on short- to medium-distance inter-city service in the provinces of Ontario and Quebec. The LRC family includes both locomotives and passenger carriages designed to work together, though the two can be, and now are, used separately. The last locomotives were retired in 2001 but the coaches remain in service.

Note: Via owns a singular lounge LRC car.

Renaissance

The Renaissance fleet was originally built by Alstom in the mid-1990s for the proposed Nightstar overnight service between the United Kingdom and continental Europe through the Channel Tunnel. Via acquired the entire fleet in 2000 for C$130 million after the Nightstar concept was abandoned. Via entered the cars into service in 2002. Presently, four sets are in service: two on the Ocean, overnight between Montreal and Halifax, and two in the corridor, between Ottawa and Quebec City.

RDC

The Budd Rail Diesel Car (RDC) is a self-propelled diesel multiple unit railcar. These were used extensively by both the Canadian National and Canadian Pacific Railways for outlying routes. Via currently rosters seven RDCs and contracted with Industrial Rail Services for C$12.6 million to refurbish and upgrade all six. The upgraded units would include new seating, wheelchair accessible washrooms, LED interior lighting, controls, wiring, heating, air conditioning systems, braking systems and rebuilt engines that meet Euro 2 standards. The rebuilt units have also been modified to remove the control cab from one end of each unit, so passengers are never required to pass through the cab when entering or exiting the train. Following the bankruptcy of IRSI, work rebuilding the RDCs was completed by Canadian Allied Diesel (CAD) at the IRSI facility in Moncton.

Others

Future
The 2018 Canadian federal budget included funding for the purchase of 32 trainsets to replace equipment used in Corridor service in Ontario and Quebec.  With money allocated, Via issued a request for proposals in 2018, with delivery of the new rolling stock scheduled for 2022. In December 2018, VIA Rail Canada ordered 32, 5-car trainsets (for a total of 160 cars) from Siemens for use on the Québec City–Windsor Corridor, at a cost of $989 million. Trainsets will be powered by diesel-electric Charger locomotives, with passenger car trainsets from the Siemens Venture family. Similar trainsets are used on Amtrak Midwest and Brightline in the United States, and Railjet in Austria and the Czech Republic.

References

External links 

Via Rail: Our Fleet

 
Canada railway-related lists
Lists of rolling stock